Detention is an American animated television series created by Bob Doucette that premiered on Kids' WB on September 11, 1999 to March 25, 2000. The series ran for one season of 13 half-hour episodes.

Synopsis
The series is about a group of eight lawless 6th grade students from Benedict Arnold Middle School in Oak Forest who continually find themselves in detention. The kids are constantly trying to stay out of detention and out of trouble.

Characters
 Shareena Wickett (voiced by Tara Strong) – A Gothic 12-year-old girl that prefers to be a free spirit and finds pleasure in the sublime. Shareena's beliefs are never taken seriously by her parents. Her hobbies include reading horror stories and a talent of séances.
 Emmitt Roswell (voiced by Billy West) – A conspiracy theorist who explains that intelligent life exists in outer space and is determined to make contact with aliens. As stated in Boyz 'n The Parenthood, Emmitt has an estranged father.
 Jim Kim (voiced by the series' writer Roger Eschbacher) – A shy kid with a love for comic book superheroes, particularly from DC Comics. He takes on the characters' attributes at inopportune times.
 Ramone "Gug" Gugliamo (voiced by Carlos Alazraqui) – A short Latino kid with a short temper. Constantly left out of competitive sports, Gug constantly picks fights with kids twice his own size and has even wanted to take down Miss Kisskillya. He and Emmitt have their occasional rivalries, however, they both agree on their lack of patience with Jim.
 Duncan Bubble – A quiet boy who is always playing with a yo-yo and not speaking. He instead uses his yo-yo to spell out messages (for example, "Thanks guys", "Boring", and "Yeah"), accompanied by an electronic voice (done by the show's creator Bob Doucette) reading the message. He is based on a deaf friend Doucette (the show's creator) had during production.
 Lemonjella and Orangejella LaBelle (voiced by Tia Mowry and Tamera Mowry) – A pair of identical African-American twins. They have been known to get themselves in trouble by hacking into the school computers and removing library fines. Their scientific descriptions tend to confuse Miss Kisskillya and the other kids, so they would simplify them to make sense. They have shown to be competitive with each other.
 Shelley Kelly (voiced by Pamelyn Ferdin) – An optimistic and peppy girl who wears the same Ladybug Scout uniform and the only kid in detention not due to rule breaking but because she is Ms. Kisskillya's assistant. She constantly kisses up to Miss Kisskillya and has a crush on Emmitt. As a result, she is often detested by the other kids, whom she wishes to be friends with (she seems to have succeeded with Shareena to an extent). However, on some occasions, Shelley is an ally to the other kids.
 Eugenia P. Kisskillya (voiced by Kathleen Freeman) – The gym teacher and detention monitor of Benedict Arnold Middle School. Having been a military sergeant in the Marine Corps, Miss Kisskillya bosses the children around like such, calls other people by rankings in the army, and usually pronounces "detention" as "dee-tennnn-shun!!" The only student she likes is Shelley Kelly, who serves as her "Teacher's Pet" and whom she refers to as "Private Kelly". Despite usually being often times tyrannical towards the children, she has been shown to be a nice person. She is based on creator's grade schoolteacher who was a nun, as well as Freeman's character, the strict Sister Mary Stigmata, from The Blues Brothers and Blues Brothers 2000.

Broadcast and home media
In Fall 1999, the show aired on Saturdays at 10:30 a.m. and later moved to 11:00 a.m. EST beginning on November 6. In Spring 2000, the show moved to 11:30 a.m. EST on Saturdays. Reruns of the show aired on the Kids' WB Friday afternoon lineup from September 8, 2000 to August 31, 2001. Since 2018, the show has been available on iTunes and on DVD in Region 1 as a Manufacture-on-Demand (MOD) release that is only available through the Warner Archive website and other online stores.

Episodes

References

External links
 
 Detention episode guide @ Big Cartoon DataBase

1999 American television series debuts
2000 American television series endings
1990s American animated television series
2000s American animated television series
1990s American school television series
2000s American school television series
American children's animated comedy television series
Animated television series about children
English-language television shows
Kids' WB original shows
The WB original programming
Middle school television series
Television series by Warner Bros. Animation